Webster County High School, in Upperglade, West Virginia, is a public high school that opened in 1974.

History
Webster County High School was opened in 1974. Webster County High School Highlanders. It was the result of the consolidation of Cowen High School and Webster Springs High School. The two rival schools agreed on a new mascot and new school colors. Mr. Daniel Bean became the first principal of the new school.  Webster County High School was built on land acquired by eminent domain from Twyla M. Robinson daughter of James B. Miller and Alice I. Williams.  The land acquisition was disputed, in the courts, until the mid-1980s.

On February 19, 2008, Senator Jay Rockefeller visited Webster County High School to speak with students about technology in education. During his visit, he expressed the importance of federal eRate funding for schools, libraries, and rural health facilities.

Student body
The size of the student body has dropped since the school opened. When it opened it had over 900 students. Presently, on average, during any given year it contains 600 to 800 total students.

Nickname
Webster County's teams are nicknamed the "Highlanders" using a Scotsman with a set of bagpipes as the school logo.

Notable alumni
 Josh Stewart – actor on the television shows Third Watch and Dirt.

Extracurricular activities

Sports
Webster County High School fields several Class AA sports teams, including:
 Boys: basketball, football, baseball, cross country, track, archery, soccer, and wrestling.
 Girls: basketball, cheerleading, showgirls, softball, cross country, archery, soccer, volleyball, and track.
Richwood High School is Webster County's main rival. The two football teams play each other the first week of the season for the Wagon Wheel.

On March 16, 2019, Webster County's boys basketball team won the school's first state championship, finishing the season with a perfect 28-0 record.

WCHS is also the home of the Highlander Show Band and Showgirls. They have won many awards and are highly regarded throughout the country. Their uniform consists of black bottoms with red jackets and black hats, with silver plumes. Their program is fed by the Highlanders of Tomorrow Band program (consists of Webster Springs and Hacker Valley Elementary Schools) and Glade Elementary School.

Clubs
 Student Council - Student Council is in charge of Homecoming, and other school functions.
 FCA - Fellowship of Christian Athletes
 NHS - National Honor Society
 Health Science Tech. Academy (HSTA)
 Upward Bound
 HOSA
 Math Field Day
 Theatre
 International Thespian Society
 Peer Mediators
 Science Bowl Team
 Upward Bound
 Geography Bowl
 Chorus
 Band
 Drama
 JROTC
 FOR Club
 Webster County SADD Program
 Anonymous

Classes
 Publications
 Catering
 CNA

See also
 List of high schools in West Virginia
 Education in West Virginia

Notes

External links
 School website
 School newspaper website
 student-produced videos on TeacherTube

Public high schools in West Virginia
Educational institutions established in 1974
Schools in Webster County, West Virginia